Adrian Minune  (real name Adrian Simionescu, born 24 September 1974) is a Romanian manele singer of Romani descent.

One major hit for the Manele Singer was at the '''Neversea Festival''' in 2019, when the swedish DJ '''Salvatore Ganacci''' honored him by playing his famous song “Așa sunt zilele mele”.

Personal life 
Adrian Minune married his longtime life-partner Elena in 2004, and has two daughters (Karmen and Adriana) and a son (Adrian Jr.) with her. His mother, Florenţa, who raised him alone since he was two years old, also lives with them.

Filmography 
He has made appearances in:
 Gadjo dilo (1997) as L'Enfant Prodige
 The Rage (Furia) (2002) as himself

See also 
 Manele
 Lăutari
 Nicolae Guţă
 Costi Ioniţă

References 
 Article about Minune's wedding
 Article about Minune and his mother

External links 
 
 list of top tracks
 Listen to Radio Manele
 Radio Manele
 Radio Manele Online

1974 births
Living people
Romani musicians
Romanian Romani people
Romanian manele singers
Lăutari and lăutărească music
21st-century Romanian singers